The NATO Training Mission-Iraq (NTM-I) was established in 2004 at the request of the Iraqi Interim Government under the provisions of UN Security Council Resolution 1546. The aim of NTM-I was to assist in the development of Iraqi security forces training structures and institutions so that Iraq could build an effective and sustainable capability that addressed the needs of the nation. NTM-I was not a combat mission but was a distinct mission, under the political control of NATO's North Atlantic Council. Its operational emphasis was on training and mentoring. The activities of the mission were coordinated with Iraqi authorities and the US-led Deputy Commanding General Advising and Training (DCG (A&T)), who was also dual-hatted as the Commander of NTM-I.  The mission came to an end in December 2011.

Activity
NTM-I delivered training, advice and mentoring support along three main lines of activity:
 Support to the Iraqi Command and Control structure.
 The professionalization of Iraqi Armed Forces Officers training and education and the professional development at the Non-Commissioned Officer Academy both within Iraq and abroad. Complementing institutional education is the NTM-I role in developing Iraqi doctrine. Finally, supporting this line of activity is NATO out-of-country training which saw over 1800 members of the Iraqi security forces attend specialized training abroad from 2004 to 2011.
 Professionalization of the Iraqi Police through the Carabinieri-led training.

The challenge for NTM-I was in the transition from being a training provider to becoming a mentor of trainers and ultimately establishing the capability for Iraq to autonomously organise and direct security force training as part of a broader strategic relationship with NATO. 2010 was a significant year in Iraq, as the United States continued to withdraw their combat forces, and the Iraqi Armed Forces and Ministry of Interior took on further security responsibilities. The main activities during transition were the standardisation of Iraqi Officer Education and Training (OET), the training of the Iraqi Federal Police, and the assistance to the Directorate of Border Security.

Through its activities NTM-I helped pave the way for a long-term relationship between the Alliance and Iraq under a Structured Cooperation Framework.

NTM-I operated in four different areas in-theatre:

 The NTM-I Headquarters (HQ) resided within the Union III Forward Operating Base in the International Zone. NATO staff traveled to different ISF locations within the IZ to provide training, advising and mentoring.
 The NTM-I Forward base at Rustamiyah, some 15 km south east of Baghdad, supported the Iraqi Military Academy and the Joint Staff College, as well as the Base Defence Battalion that maintained security at Rustamiyah.
 NTM-I also operated at the Taji Air Base, 27 km north west of Baghdad, which supported the training of the Iraqi Senior Non-Commissioned Officer courses and the Battle Staff Training.
 The fourth location was Camp Dublin, located south of Baghdad International Airport. This is where the Italian Carabinieri Training Unit carried out the training of the Iraqi Federal Police.

23 NATO member countries and one partner country contributed directly to the training effort through the provision of personnel, funding or equipment donations. The NTM-I footprint was a small tactical force of around 170 NATO/Partnership for Peace personnel, representing 13 member nations (as at August 2010).

Primary NATO Contributions

  – 60 instructors and a protection company in addition to airlift support and logistics.
  – In July 2010, the Italian Army deployed 90 soldiers to Iraq under NTM-I: a Major General, Deputy Commander of the mission; a senior officer, Advisor of the Iraqi Minister of Defense, in an advisory capacity for training and liaison with the NTM-I HQ; a senior officer, an adviser to Iraq's top military university (National Defense University), which coordinated, along with his staff, the training-instructional and doctrinal development within training institutes for officers at the "National Defence College" and "Joint Staff and Command College"; a senior officer of the Carabinieri, head of the "Gendarmerie Training Division", with a team of about 60 Carabinieri, carried out training of VET; unit of the Carabinieri providing training of Iraqi police at Camp Dublin, trainer of NTM-I area near Baghdad International Airport. Additionally, a senior officer of the Italian Navy served as the Advisor of the Commander of Naval Forces in Iraq.
  – A contingent of Danish troops deployed to train Iraqi forces under NTM-I, numbering 10 trainers and seven soldiers for force protection in September 2007.
  – 10 military police and 15 trainers deployed to Iraq in September 2007
  – The UK has deployed 11 soldiers to Iraq under NTM-I.
  – As of September 2007, 2 Turkish soldiers served in Baghdad.
  – As of September 2007, there were 2 instructors in Iraq, while the deployment of 5 more was a possibility.
  – 3 Lithuanian trainers deployed to Iraq in September 2007.
  – Three officers as of October 2008.
  – One officer deployed under NTM-I in September 2008.
  – Portuguese Army contributed from February 2005 until the end of NTM-I mission usually with six officers and two NCOs.
  – In October 2006, the Bulgarian government sent 4 officers.
  - As of September 2009, the Albanian government sent 1 officer and 1 NCO with rotation bases, as part of NTM-I in Baghdad.

Withdrawn
  – Four soldiers deployed under NTM-I in December 2008
  – A 'public information officer' was withdrawn in September 2007.
  – 5 instructors were withdrawn in April 2007.
  – Sent 4 trainers to Iraq in 2006, these men have since been withdrawn.
  – 10 trainers were withdrawn in September 2007.
  – There were 3 Hungarian soldiers serving under NTM-I as of November, 2008.

Other NATO Contributions
Germany also trained Iraqi logistics troops in a separate UAE-based mission as of December 2004. Belgium offered 10 instructors to the latter programme.
 ,  – Separately offered to conduct training outside Iraq; the former did not specify where, while the latter suggested Qatar.
  – Donated second-hand tanks to the Iraqi Army.
Latvia, Lithuania and Turkey offered to host similar programmes.

Non-NATO Contributions
  – Although not a NATO member, Jordan's contribution was by far the most extensive, having graduated 50,000 Iraqi police officers by February 2007, plus smaller numbers of Iraqi Army soldiers and Air Force personnel. Jordan also donated a substantial number of tanks.
  – Invited an Iraqi Army company to participate in joint military training in 2004.
  – since December 2006, when 8 officers were sent to Iraq. There were 8 officers in January 2010, and all withdrew by December 2011.

See also
 Multi-National Force – Iraq

References

External links
 http://www.jfcnaples.nato.int/training_mission_iraq.aspx

Military units and formations of NATO
Iraq War